was a Japanese painter, noted for his pioneering work in developing the yōga (Western-style) art movement in late 19th-century Japanese painting.There were many Japanese painters who tried Western painting and Western style painting in the modern age, but Yuichi is said to be the first "Western painter" in Japan who learned full-scale oil painting techniques and was active from the late Edo period to the middle of the Meiji era.

Biography

Takahashi was born to a samurai-class household at the Edo residence of Sano Domain, a subsidiary han of Sakura Domain, where his father was a retainer of the Hotta clan. Interested in art from childhood, he apprenticed to the Kanō school, but later became fascinated with western-style art through lithographs which were being available in Japan during the Bakumatsu period. In 1862, he obtained a place in the arts department of the Bansho Shirabesho, the Tokugawa shogunate's research institute in western learning, where he studied under Kawakami Togai, and where he began experimentation with oil painting. In 1866, he went to Yokohama to study under the English artist and cartoonist Charles Wirgman, who was so impressed with his talent that he sponsored his participation in the Paris World Exhibition of 1867.

After the Meiji Restoration, despite his largely self-taught credentials, he was appointed a professor of art at the Kobubijutsu Gakkō (the Technical Fine Arts School) by the new Meiji government, and was a student and an assistant for the Italian foreign advisor Antonio Fontanesi, who had been hired by the Meiji government in the late 1870s to introduce western oil painting to Japan.

In 1879, he entered a contest sponsored by the Kotohira-gū shrine in Shikoku for ceiling panel paintings, donating all of the paintings to the shrine after the contest. The shrine still displays a collection of 27 of his paintings. Also in 1879, Takahashi was recommended by the Genrōin to become a court painter, and was commissioned to paint a portrait of the emperor.
In 1881, he received a large commission from Viscount Mishima Michitsune to paint scenes of public works projects in Yamagata prefecture.

Takahashi produced mostly portraiture and landscape paintings, but also still life works. His best-known painting is a salmon hung up to dry, which has been recognized by the Agency for Cultural Affairs of the Japanese government as an Important Cultural Property of Japan.
He died at home in 1897.

Noted works
, 1872, Tokyo University of the Arts, National Important Cultural Property 
, 1877, Tokyo University of the Arts, National Important Cultural Property

References
 Keene, Donald. Dawn to the West. Columbia University Press; (1998). 
 Mason, Penelope. History of Japanese Art . Prentice Hall (2005). 
 Miyoshi, Masao. Postmodernism and Japan. Duke University Press (1986) 
 Sadao, Tsuneko. Discovering the Arts of Japan: A Historical Overview. Kodansha International (2003). 
 Schaarschmidt Richte. Japanese Modern Art Painting From 1910 . Edition Stemmle. 
 Weisenfeld, Gennifer. MAVO: Japanese Artists and the Avant-Garde, 1905–1931. University of California Press (2001). 
　MoMAK　京都国立近代美術館
https://www.momak.go.jp/Japanese/exhibitionArchive/2012/393.html
 ネット美術館「アートまとめん」
http://artmatome.com/高橋由一%E3%80%80【略歴と作品一覧】/
中右恵理子; 長峯朱里. "II 高橋由一作《鮭図》 の絵画材料および技法について". 2018.平成30年度文化財保存修復研究センター紀要,15-28
高階, 絵里加. 高橋由一<山形市街図>と江戸名所絵. 人文學報 2011, 101:19-35
隈元謙次郎(Kenjiro Kumamoto)"高橋由一の風景画(Landscape Paintings by Takahashi Yuichi)"美術研究(The bijutsu kenkyu : the journal of art studies),160:31 - 44
[1]東京藝術大学大学美術館収蔵品データベース"美人(花魁)" http://jmapps.ne.jp/geidai/det.html?data_id=4124

[2]東京藝術大学大学美術館収蔵品データベース"鮭" http://jmapps.ne.jp/geidai/det.html?data_id=4126

External links

1828 births
1894 deaths
Court painters
Japanese portrait painters
People of Meiji-period Japan
Yōga painters
19th-century Japanese painters
Artists from Tokyo
Artists from Tokyo Metropolis